Wallaby Jim of the Islands is a 1937 American adventure film directed by Charles Lamont and written by Bennett Cohen and Houston Branch. The film stars George F. Houston, Ruth Coleman, Douglas Walton, Wilhelm von Brincken, Mamo Clark and Colin Campbell. The film was released on December 17, 1937, by Grand National Films Inc., a poverty row studio.

Plot
Jim and his men found a valuable source of pearls in the South Pacific. However, his partner Brooks lost most of their money on gambling and Jim now has no money to fill the claim for the pearls. His rival Ritcher takes advantage of the situation.

Cast           
George F. Houston as Wallaby Jim
Ruth Coleman as Allison
Douglas Walton as Norman Brooks
Wilhelm von Brincken as Adolph Richter
Mamo Clark as Lana
Colin Campbell as Limey
Syd Saylor as Jake
Juan Torena as Pascal the Thief
Nick Thompson as Carneli Joe
Warner Richmond as Karl Haage
Edward Gargan as Buck Morgan
Wilson Benge as Macklin 
Chris-Pin Martin as Mike 
Kenneth Harlan as Michael Corell

References

External links
 

1937 films
American adventure films
1937 adventure films
Grand National Films films
Films directed by Charles Lamont
American black-and-white films
1930s English-language films
1930s American films
English-language adventure films